Athanasios Parios (1722–1813) was a Greek hieromonk who was a notable theologian, philosopher, educator, and hymnographer of his time, and one of the "Teachers of the Nation" during the Modern Greek Enlightenment. He was the second leader of the Kollyvades Movement, succeeding Neophytos Kausokalyvites (1713–1784). He also authored the lives of various saints. Athanasios was born in Kostos, a small village of Paros, in the year 1722 and died in Chios in 1813. He is commemorated by the Greek Orthodox Church on June 24.

Despite this, modern Greek critics consider him a reactionary Orthodox fundamentalist, enemy of the Western European ideas of the French revolution, opponent of Rigas Feraios and Adamantios Korais.

History
1722 - Born in the village of Kostos, on the island of Paros. (Some sources give 1721, others range from 1723 to 1725. However, the plaque outside his church in Kostos lists 1722 as his birth year).
On the island of Paros he received instruction in the "common letters." Desiring higher education, he left his parents and his native place and went to Smyrna, to study at the Greek school of that city. The school was founded in 1717, and was later named the Evangelical School, and became famous. He resided in Smyrna for six years.
1752 - Went to Mount Athos and enrolled in the Athonite Academy, where he studied under Neophytos Kausokalyvites and Eugenios Voulgaris. He later studied at Corfu under Nikephoros Theotokis.
1767–1770 - Taught at Thessaloniki, after which he returned to the Athonite School to become director.
1776 - Condemned as a heretic, defrocked, and excommunicated by Patriarch Sophronios II and the Holy Synod of Constantinople
1781 - Successfully defended himself before Patriarch Gabriel IV and the Holy Synod, and restored to communion and the priesthood
1788–1811 - Principal of the School in Chios.
At the age of 90, he withdrew to the cell of St. George the Refston and died there on June 24, 1813.

Works
1785 - Antipapas, analyses the work of Saint Mark of Ephesus.
1797 - Paternal Teaching, written by Athanasios, but published under the name of Patriarch Anthimos of Jerusalem.
1798 - Christian Apologies
1787 - Rhetorical Pragmatics and Metaphysics
1802 - A Response to the Irrational Zeal of the Philosophers Coming from Europe
1806 - Epitome, a theology textbook, which was a collaboration with Saint Makarios of Corinth.

Relations
Athanasios (d. September 8, 1774). Athanasios was from the town of Koulakia, near Thessaloniki, and was provided a good education, studying under Athanasios Parios in Thessaloniki. He later went to Mount Athos to the Vatopedi Monastery where he became a monk. Athanasius later was martyred for Christ, not willing to convert to the Islamic faith. He was hanged and buried near the Church of St. Paraskeve.
Minas Minoidis (d. France). Minas was a student of Athanasios Parios. He taught rhetoric and philosophy in Serres and Thessaloniki; he also taught ancient Greek and literature in Paris. He was an interpreter at the French Ministry of Foreign Affairs and a Chevalier of the Legion of Honour. Minas was militantly opposed to Korais' ideas on language, his most severe and unfair critic. He was a fervent supporter of the fight for Greek independence. He discovered the verse "Myths of Vavrios" in a Mount Athos manuscript.
Ierotheos Dendrinos and Christodoulos, Doctor of Philosophy.
St. Nikephoros of Chios (May 1), was sent to the city of Chios to be educated in its schools by Gabriel Astrakaris. Nikephoros remained close to this priest throughout the period of his education, where he developed a love for learning, and a respect for those who taught others. He also met St. Athanasius Parios, who was the director of the school in the city of Chios.

References

Further reading
Saint Athanasios Parios (Modern Orthodox Saints, vol. 15) by Constantine Cavarnos. 
St. Athanasios of Paros, together with St. Macarios of Corinth and St. Nicodemos the Hagiorite were the three great spiritual leaders of the 18th century in Greece and leaders of the "Kollyvades Movement."  This is the first English-language life of St. Athanasios, theologian, hymnographer, writer of lives of saints and philosopher. Also contains reviews and selected passages from his writings, and a brief account of the life of St. Macarios of Corinth.  170pp.

External links
St Athanasius Parios (OCA)
Saint Athanasios Parios (Mystagogy)

1720s births
1813 deaths
18th-century Greek philosophers
19th-century Greek philosophers
Saints of Ottoman Greece
Greek theologians
People from Paros
Greek saints of the Eastern Orthodox Church
18th-century Greek writers
19th-century Greek writers
18th-century Greek educators
19th-century Greek educators
People associated with Mount Athos
People associated with Vatopedi